Normanton Airport  is an airport in Normanton, Queensland, Australia. A new terminal was opened in February 2006. The airport received $132,100 for security upgrades in 2006.

Airlines and destinations

See also
 List of airports in Queensland

References

Airports in Queensland
North West Queensland
Gulf of Carpentaria